The 2011 Hel van het Mergelland was the 38th edition of the Volta Limburg Classic cycle race and was held on 2 April 2011. The race started and finished in Eijsden. The race was won by Pim Ligthart.

General classification

References

2011
2011 in road cycling
2011 in Dutch sport